The Estádio Rei Pelé, also known as Trapichão, is a multi-purpose stadium in Maceió, Brazil. It is currently used mostly for football matches. The stadium holds 19,105. The stadium was built in 1970.

Estádio Rei Pelé is owned by the Government of Alagoas and it is the stadium where CRB and CSA play their home matches. The stadium is named after the footballer Pelé (1940–2022), and its name means King Pelé. The stadium is nicknamed Trapichão because it is located in Trapiche da Barra neighborhood.

There is a museum inside the stadium, called Museu de Esportes Edvaldo Santa Rosa, named after an Alagoan footballer nicknamed Dida (1934–2002), who played for Clube de Regatas do Flamengo and the Brazil national football team.

History
In 1970, Estádio Rei Pelé was completed. The inaugural match was played on October 25 of that year, when Santos beat an Alagoas State All-Stars 5–0. The first goal of the stadium was scored by Santos' Douglas. The stadium's attendance record currently stands at 45,865, set on the inaugural match.

References

Enciclopédia do Futebol Brasileiro, Volume 2 - Lance, Rio de Janeiro: Aretê Editorial S/A, 2001.

External links
Templos do Futebol

Clube de Regatas Brasil
Centro Sportivo Alagoano
Rei Pele
Maceió
Multi-purpose stadiums in Brazil
Sports venues in Alagoas
Sports venues completed in 1970
1970 establishments in Brazil
Things named after Pelé